Clover Valley can refer to the following:
Clover Valley, Bruce County, Ontario, a community in Huron-Kinloss Township, Ontario, Canada
Clover Valley, Manitoulin District, Ontario, a community in Assiginack Township, Ontario, Canada
Clover Valley, Minnesota, an unincorporated community in Saint Louis County, Minnesota, United States
Clover Valley (Nevada), in Elko County

Clover Valley may also refer to the Dollar General brand